Jamil Hanoon (born 1 July 1942) is a coach and former international Iraqi football player, he also played for Al-Minaa.

Jamil is the older brother of international player and coach Jalil Hanoon.

International career
Jamil Hanoon was called by Croatian coach Ljubomir Kokeza to play in the 1969 Friendship Cup in Iran. On March 7, 1969 he played his debut with Iraq against Iran in fully international match, that ended 2–1 for Iran.

Managerial career
In 1977 Hanoon started training with his club Al-Minaa, which he retired from, and in the Iraqi Premier League in the 1977-1978 season after former coach Faleh Hassan Wasfi failed to win the first two games and resigned. Hanoon led Al-Minaa team in a series of excellent results and won the league title in that season without any loss.

Managerial statistics

Honours

Manager
Al-Minaa
Iraqi League: 1977–78

Photo Gallery

References

External links
 Iraqi national team players database
Al-Minaa Club: Sailors of south

1942 births
Living people
Iraqi footballers
Al-Mina'a SC players
Sportspeople from Basra
Iraq international footballers
Iraqi football managers
Al-Mina'a SC managers
Association footballers not categorized by position